J. R. R. Tolkien, a fantasy author and professional philologist, drew on the Old English poem Beowulf for multiple aspects of his Middle-earth legendarium, alongside other influences. He used elements such as names, monsters, and the structure of society in a heroic age. He emulated its style, creating an impression of depth and adopting an elegiac tone. Tolkien admired the way that Beowulf, written by a Christian looking back at a pagan past, just as he was, embodied a "large symbolism" without ever becoming allegorical. He worked to echo the symbolism of life's road and individual heroism in The Lord of the Rings.

The names of races, including ents, orcs, and elves, and place names such as Orthanc and Meduseld, derive from Beowulf. The werebear Beorn in The Hobbit has been likened to the hero Beowulf himself; both names mean "bear" and both characters have enormous strength. 
Scholars have compared some of Tolkien's monsters to those in Beowulf. Both his trolls and Gollum share attributes with Grendel, while Smaug's characteristics closely match those of the Beowulf dragon.
Tolkien's Riders of Rohan are distinctively Old English, and he has made use of multiple elements of Beowulf in creating them, including their language, culture, and poetry.

Context 

Beowulf is an epic poem in Old English, telling the story of its eponymous pagan hero. He becomes King of the Geats after ridding Heorot, the hall of the Danish king Hrothgar, of the monster Grendel, who was ravaging the land; he dies saving his people from a dragon. The tale is told in a roundabout way with many digressions into history and legend, and with a constant elegiac tone, ending in a dirge. It was written by a Christian poet, looking back reflectively on a time already in his people's distant past.

J. R. R. Tolkien was an English author and philologist of ancient Germanic languages, specialising in Old English; he spent much of his career as a professor at the University of Oxford. He is best known for his novels about his invented Middle-earth, The Hobbit and The Lord of the Rings. A devout Roman Catholic, he described The Lord of the Rings as "a fundamentally religious and Catholic work", rich in Christian symbolism.

The Tolkien scholar Tom Shippey, like Tolkien a philologist, called Beowulf the single work that most strongly influenced Tolkien, out of the many other sources that he used. He made use of it in his Middle-earth legendarium in multiple ways: in specific story-elements such as monsters; in Old English culture, as seen in the kingdom of Rohan; in the aesthetic style of The Lord of the Rings, with its impression of depth and its elegiac tone; and in its "large symbolism".

People

A philologist's races 

Tolkien made use of his philological expertise on Beowulf to create some of the races of Middle-earth. The list of supernatural creatures in Beowulf, "ettens and elves and demon-corpses", contributed to his Orcs, and Elves, and to an allusion to Ettens in his "Ettenmoors" placename. 
His tree-giants or Ents (etymologically close to Ettens) may derive from a phrase in another Old English poem, Maxims II, "skilful work of giants". Shippey suggests that Tolkien took the name of the tower of Orthanc (orþanc) from the same phrase, reinterpreted as "Orthanc, the Ents' fortress".

Characters 

The word orþanc occurs again in Beowulf, alongside the term searo in the phrase , "a cunning-net sewn, by a smith's skill", meaning a mail-shirt or byrnie. Tolkien used searo in its Mercian form *saru for the name of Orthanc's ruler, the wizard Saruman, whose name could thus be translated "cunning man", incorporating the ideas of subtle knowledge and technology into Saruman's character.

An especially Beowulfian character appears in The Hobbit as Beorn; his name originally meant "bear" but came to mean "man, warrior", giving Tolkien the chance to make the character a were-bear, able to shift his shape. A bear-man Bödvar Bjarki exists in Norse myth, while it is Beowulf himself whom Beorn echoes in the Old English poem. The name "Beowulf" can indeed be read as "the Bees' Wolf", that is, "the Honey-Eater". In other words, he is "the Bear", the man who is so strong that he snaps swords and tears off the arms of monsters with his enormous bear-like strength. Shippey notes that Beorn is ferocious, rude, and cheerful, characteristics that reflect his huge inner self-confidence—itself an aspect of northern heroic courage.

Monsters 

Scholars have compared several of Tolkien's monsters, including his Trolls, Gollum, and Smaug, to those in Beowulf.

Trolls 

Beowulf's first fight is with the monster Grendel, who is often taken by scholars as a kind of troll from Norse mythology. Tolkien's trolls share some of Grendel's attributes, such as great size and strength, being impervious to ordinary swords, and favouring the night. The scholar Christina Fawcett suggests that Tolkien's "roaring Troll" in The Return of the King reflects Grendel's "firey  eye and terrible screaming". Noting that Tolkien compares them to beasts as they "came striding up, roaring like beasts ... bellowing", she observes that they "remain wordless warriors, like Grendel".

Gollum 

Gollum, a far smaller monster in Middle-earth, has also been likened to Grendel, with his preference for hunting with his bare hands and his liking for desolate, marshy places. The many parallels between these monsters include their affinity for water, their isolation from society, and their bestial description. The Tolkien scholar Verlyn Flieger suggests that he is Tolkien's central monster-figure, likening him to both Grendel and the dragon; she describes him as "the twisted, broken, outcast hobbit whose manlike shape and dragonlike greed combine both the Beowulf kinds of monster in one figure".

Smaug 

Tolkien made use of the Beowulf dragon to create one of his most distinctive monsters, the dragon in The Hobbit, Smaug. The Beowulf dragon is aroused and enraged by the theft of a golden cup from his pile of treasure; he flies out in the night and destroys Beowulf's hall; he is killed, but the treasure is cursed, and Beowulf too dies. In The Hobbit, the eponymous Hobbit protagonist Bilbo accordingly steals a golden cup from the dragon's huge mound of treasure, awakening Smaug, who flies out and burns Lake-town; the allure of gold is too much of a temptation for the Dwarf Thorin Oakenshield, who is killed soon afterwards. On the other hand, the Beowulf dragon does not speak; Tolkien has made Smaug conversational, and wily with it. Scholars have analysed the parallels between Smaug and the unnamed Beowulf dragon:

Culture of Rohan

Names, language, and heroism 

Tolkien made use of Beowulf, along with other Old English sources, for many aspects of the Riders of Rohan. Their land was the Mark, its name a version of the Mercia where he lived, in Mercian dialect *Marc. Their names are straightforwardly Old English: Éomer and Háma (characters in Beowulf), Éowyn ("Horse-joy"), Théoden ("King"). So too is their language, with words like Éothéod ("Horse-people"), Éored ("Troop of cavalry"), and Eorlingas ("people of Eorl", whose name means "[Horse-]lord", cf. Earl), where many words and names begin with the word for "horse", eo[h].

There are even spoken phrases that follow this form. As Alaric Hall notes, "'Westu Théoden hál!' cried Éomer" is a scholarly joke: a dialectal form of Beowulf's  ("Be thou well, Hrothgar!") i.e. Éomer shouts "Long Live King Theoden!" in a Mercian accent. Tolkien used this West Midlands dialect of Old English because he had been brought up in that region.

Théoden's hall, Meduseld, is modelled on Beowulf's Heorot, as is the way it is guarded, with visitors challenged repeatedly but courteously. Heorot's golden thatched roof is described in line 311 of Beowulf which Tolkien directly translates as a description of Meduseld: "The light of it shines far over the land", representing líxte se léoma ofer landa fela. 

The war horns of the Riders of Rohan exemplify, in Shippey's view, the "heroic Northern world", as in what he calls the nearest Beowulf has to a moment of Tolkien-like eucatastrophe, when Ongentheow's Geats, trapped all night, hear the horns of Hygelac's men coming to rescue them; the Riders blow their horns wildly as they finally arrive, turning the tide of the Battle of the Pelennor Fields at a climactic moment in The Lord of the Rings.

Alliterative verse 

Among the many poems in The Lord of the Rings are examples of Tolkien's skill in imitating Old English alliterative verse, keeping strictly to the metrical structure, which he described in his essay On Translating Beowulf. The Tolkien scholar Mark Hall compares Aragorn's lament for Boromir to Scyld Scefing's ship-burial in Beowulf:

Style

Impression of depth 

A quality of literature that Tolkien particularly prized was the impression of depth, of hidden vistas into ancient history. He found this especially in Beowulf, but also in other works that he admired, such as Virgil's Aeneid, Shakespeare's Macbeth, Sir Orfeo, and Grimms' Fairy Tales.  Beowulf contains numerous digressions into other stories which have functions other than advancing the plot, in Adrien Bonjour's words rendering "the background of the poem extraordinarily alive", and providing contrasts and examples that repeatedly illuminate the key points of the main story with flashes of the distant past. Tolkien stated in The Monsters and the Critics that Beowulf:

In addition, Tolkien valued particularly the "shimmer of suggestion" that never exactly becomes explicit, but that constantly hints at greater depth. That is just as in Beowulf, where Tolkien described the quality as the "glamour of Poesis", though whether this was, Shippey notes, an effect of distance in time, the "elvish hone of antiquity", or a kind of memory or vision of paradise is never distinguished.

Elegiac tone 

The Lord of the Rings, especially its last part, The Return of the King, has a consistent elegiac tone, in this resembling Beowulf. The Tolkien scholar Marjorie Burns describes it as a "sense of inevitable disintegration". The author and scholar Patrice Hannon calls it "a story of loss and longing, punctuated by moments of humor and terror and heroic action but on the whole a lament for a world—albeit a fictional world—that has passed even as we seem to catch a last glimpse of it flickering and fading".

"Large symbolism" 

Shippey notes that Tolkien wrote of Beowulf that the "large symbolism is near the surface, but ... does not break through, nor become allegory", for if it did, that would constrain the story, like that of The Lord of the Rings, to have just one meaning. That sort of constraint was something that Tolkien "contemptuously" dismissed in his foreword to the second edition, stating that he preferred applicability, giving readers the freedom to read into the novel what they could see in it. The message could be hinted at, repeatedly, and they would work, Shippey writes, "only if they were true both in fact and in fiction"; Tolkien set out to make The Lord of the Rings work the same way.

A learned Christian's heroic world 

Another theme, in both Beowulf and The Lord of the Rings, is that of the good pagan pre-Catholics such as Aragorn, who would on a strict interpretation of Christianity be damned as they had no knowledge of Christ. Tolkien stated in a letter to his friend the Jesuit priest Robert Murray that he had cut religion out of the work because it "is absorbed into the story and the symbolism". George Clark writes that Tolkien saw the Beowulf poet as

Contrasted heroes 

Flieger contrasts the warrior-hero Aragorn with the suffering hero Frodo. Aragorn is, like Beowulf, an epic/romance hero, a bold leader and a healer-king. Frodo is "the little man of fairy tale", the little brother who unexpectedly turns out to be brave. But the fairy tale happy ending comes to Aragorn, marrying the beautiful princess (Arwen) and winning the kingdom (Gondor and Arnor); while Frodo gets "defeat and disillusionment—the stark, bitter ending typical of the Iliad, Beowulf, the Morte D'Arthur". In other words, the two types of hero are not only contrasted, but combined, halves of their legends swapped over.

The road of life 

The symbolism of the road of life can be glimpsed in many places, illuminating different aspects. Tolkien's poem The Old Walking Song is repeated, with variations, three times in The Lord of the Rings. The last version contains the words "The Road goes ever on and on / Out from the door where it began. ... But I at last with weary feet / Will turn towards the lighted inn". Shippey writes that "if 'the lighted inn' on the road means death, then 'the Road' must mean life", and the poem and the novel could be speaking of the process of psychological individuation. Beowulf, too, concerns the life and death of its hero. Flieger writes that Tolkien saw Beowulf as "a poem of balance, the opposition of ends and beginnings": the young Beowulf rises, sails to Denmark, kills Grendel, becomes King; many years later, the old Beowulf falls, killing the dragon but going to his own death. In Flieger's view, Tolkien has built the same values, balance, and opposition into The Lord of the Rings, but at the same time rather than one after the other.

Notes

References

Sources 

 
  
  
 
 
 
 
 
 
 
 
 
 
 
 
 
  
 
 
        
      
  

Beowulf
Middle-earth
Themes of The Lord of the Rings
Issues of cultural influence